Branderslev is a small town in Lolland, Denmark that is situated 4 km southeast of Sandby and 3 km north of Nakskov. , the town has a population of 203. Branderslev is administered under Lolland Municipality and is located in Zealand Region.

Notable people 
 Christian Falster (1690 in Branderslev – 1752) a Danish poet and philologist, became rector of the school at Ribe.
 Gustav Wied (1858 in Branderslev – 1914) a Danish writer, a satirical critic of society in his time

References

 
Lolland Municipality